Swimming at the 2014 Summer Youth Olympics was held from 17 to 22 August at the Nanjing Olympic Sports Center in Nanjing, China.

Qualification
Each National Olympic Committee (NOC) can enter a maximum of 8 athletes, 4 per each gender and 2 per each event. As hosts, China is given the maximum quota and 112 places, 56 per each gender will be decided by the Tripartite Commission. The remaining 280 places, 140 per each gender qualified by achieving the Qualifying Standard Time (“A standard” allows 2 athletes in an event while the “B standard” allows 1 athlete in an event) and being among the top 140 eligible athletes in the FINA Points Table. Also only the 16 nations with the most FINA points after the 2013 World Aquatics Championships will be allowed to qualify the maximum quota. All other nations can only qualify 4 athletes, 2 per each gender.

To be eligible to participate at the Youth Olympics athletes must have been born between 1 January 1996 and 31 December 1999.

Qualifying Standard Times

Athletes have from 1 April 2013 to 8 June 2014 to achieve the qualification standards. A nation reaching the “A standard” may send up to two athletes in the event and nations reaching the “B standard” may only send one provided that the athlete is in the top 140 in the FINA Points Table.

Schedule

The schedule was released by the Nanjing Youth Olympic Games Organizing Committee.  In the table below, M stands for morning (begins 10:00), and E stands for evening (begins 18:00).

All times are CST (UTC+8)

Medal summary

Medal table

Events

Boys' events

Girls' events

Mixed events

 Swimmers who participated in the heats only and received medals.

Participating nations
145 nations participated in swimming.

  (1) 
  (1) 
  (1) 
  (2) 
  (3)
  (1) 
  (2)
  (8)
  (4) 
  (1) 
  (3) 
  (1) 
  (3) 
  (4) 
  (4) 
  (2) 
  (1)
  (2) 
  (2) 
  (1) 
  (8) 
  (1)
  (2) 
  (1) 
  (1)
  (1)
  (7)
  (1)
  (8)
  (1)
  (1)
  (1)
  (1)
  (1)
  (3)
  (3)
  (2)
  (4)
  (1)
  (2)
  (4)
  (3)
  (3)
  (2)
  (1)
  (4)
  (8)
  (1)
  (8)
  (2)
  (8)
  (4)
  (2)
  (1)
  (1)
  (2)
  (2)
  (4)
  (8)
  (2)
  (2)
  (4)
  (1)
  (3)
  (4)
  (8)
  (2)
  (8)
  (2)
  (3)
  (4)
  (1)
  (2)
  (1)
  (1)
  (1)
  (4)
  (2)
  (1)
  (1)
  (1)
  (2)
  (1)
  (2)
  (4)
  (1)
  (1)
  (4)
  (3)
  (2)
  (3)
  (7)
  (4)
  (1)
  (4)
  (1)
  (1)
  (2)
  (3)
  (2)
  (1)
  (2)
  (1)
  (4)
  (4) 
  (1)
  (1)
  (4)
  (8)
  (1)
  (1)
  (1)
  (2)
  (4)
  (1)
  (1)
  (4)
  (3)
  (4)
  (8)
  (8)
  (2) 
  (2)
  (1)
  (6)
  (4)
  (2)
  (4)
  (1)
  (2)
  (4)
  (1)
  (3)
  (2)
  (4)
  (1)
  (4)
  (1)
  (8)
  (1)
  (2)
  (4)
  (4)
  (1)
  (2)

References

External links
Official Results Book – Swimming

 
2014 Summer Youth Olympics events
Youth Summer Olympics
Swimming competitions in China
2014